Dholai Assembly constituency (Bengali: ধোলাই বিধানসভা সমষ্টি) is one of the 126 state legislative assembly constituencies in Assam state in North Eastern India. It is also one of the 7 state legislative assembly constituencies included in the Silchar Lok Sabha constituency. This constituency is reserved for the Scheduled caste candidates.

Dholai Assembly constituency

Following are details on Dholai Assembly constituency-

Country: India.
 State: Assam.
 District: Cachar district .
 Lok Sabha Constituency: Silchar Lok Sabha/Parliamentary constituency.
 Assembly Categorisation: Rural constituency.
 Literacy Level:80.36%.
 Eligible Electors as per 2021 General Elections: 1,90,791 Eligible Electors. Male Electors:98,313. Female Electors:92,477  .
 Geographic Co-Ordinates:  24°32'09.6"N 92°53'04.2"E..
 Total Area Covered:  866 square kilometres.
 Area Includes: Dholai thana [excluding circle No. 58 (Part)] circle Nos. 65, 66 and Hill Punjee and Forest villages in Sonai thana and circle Nos. 25,26 and CLEVER House T.E in circle No. 27 (Part) and forest villages in Silchar thana in Silchar sub-division, of Cachar district of Assam.
 Inter State Border : Cachar.
 Number Of Polling Stations: Year 2011-166,Year 2016-178,Year 2021-11.

Members of Legislative Assembly 

Following is the list of past members representing Dholai Assembly constituency in Assam Legislature

Election results

2021 results

2016 results

See also
 List of constituencies of Assam Legislative Assembly
 Cachar district

References

External links 
 

Assembly constituencies of Assam
Silchar
Cachar district